Jennifer on My Mind  is a 1971 American drama film based on the 1968 novel Heir by Roger L. Simon. It was directed by Noel Black from a screenplay by Erich Segal, stars Michael Brandon and Tippy Walker, and features Robert De Niro in a minor role.

This was one of the many early 1970s films dealing with addiction following the explosion of recreational drug use in the 1960s.

The basic premise of the movie is centered around two rich American young adults who meet and fall in love in Venice, Italy. With plenty of money and no real responsibilities or direction in life, the couple begin experimenting with illicit drugs. The movie travels through a series of flashbacks showing their progression from marijuana to harder drugs as a result of their complex romantic entanglement with each other.

Plot
Marcus Rottner (Brandon), 24-year-old heir of his late grandfather's fortune, is living in his New Jersey Palisades apartment as he finds out hippie girlfriend Jennifer Da Silva (Walker) has died of a heroin overdose in his living room. Fearing that he might be arrested for her death, he decides to dump her body, but not before his sister Selma (Taylor) and her psychologist boyfriend Sergei (Bonerz)—whom Marcus detests—suddenly drop in. They notice his strange behavior and suspect that he has gotten himself into trouble. They search his apartment but find nothing.

A flashback shows how Marcus and Jennifer met: He first notices Jennifer in Venice, where both are enjoying their holiday. Marcus is immediately drawn to her reckless, careless behavior, and she falls for his looks and charm. She unexpectedly leaves Europe with her parents and he follows her to their home in Oyster Bay, where they briefly date until Jennifer again cuts all ties.

Heartbroken, Marcus leaves for Venice, but returns to see Jennifer on her birthday; he's shocked to find her injecting heroin with two minstrels (Bostwick and Conaway). Marcus scares them away and tries to save Jennifer as she, under the influence, jumps from her rooftop.

Fearing that she might become a heroin addict, Marcus convinces Jennifer to return to Venice, but she grows bored and expresses her desire to return to New York. As he visits the Venetian Ghetto, she leaves a recording explaining that she cannot be with him.

He returns to the Lower East Side in Manhattan meets with his friend Ornstein (Vinovich) to get advice on how to dispose of a body in a novel. Marcus follows his advice and drives to a river. His reverie is interrupted by three Hells Angels who harass him. Their shake-down is interrupted by two police officers on motorcycles. Marcus drives off, dreamily talking of how this is the most time he has spent with Jenny.

Flashback: Marcus moves to New Jersey to clear his mind. Months later, Jennifer suddenly shows up on his doorstep, telling Marcus that she has traveled the world and still has not found her place in life. She asks to stay at his place for a while.

As he cooks her dinner, Jennifer secretly puts several prescription capsules into the blender of chocolate milk and drinks the mixture. While he sets the table on the balcony, she freaks out and he finds her in the kitchen preparing a needle over the stove flame. She climbs up on the balcony railing but he pulls her down. She asks him to inject the syringe of heroin and he does, bringing on a fatal overdose.

When a carload of men chase him, his sports car crashes, catches fire and explodes with the body in the trunk. In the final scene, he is dressed in white, back in Venice.

Cast
Michael Brandon as Marcus Rottner
Tippy Walker as Jennifer DaSilva
Steve Vinovich as Sigmund Ornstein
Lou Gilbert as Grandpa Max Rottner
Chuck McCann as Good Samaritan
Peter Bonerz as Sergei
Renée Taylor as Selma Rottner
Bruce Kornbluth as Larry Dolci
Robert De Niro as Mardigian, Cab Driver
Michael McClanathan as Hell's Angel #1
Allan F. Nicholls as Hell's Angel #2
Ralph J. Pinto as Hell's Angel #3
Barry Bostwick as Minstrel #1
Jeff Conaway as Minstrel #2
Kim Hunter as Jennifer's mother (scenes deleted)
Nick Lapadula as Motorcycle Cop
Leib Lensky as Cantor at Synagogue
Ketti Prosdocimo as Little Girl at Synagogue
Lino Turchetto as Singing Gondolier
Rehn Scofield as Hearse Passenger
Alfredo Michelangeli as Hotel Concierge

Production
A Los Angeles Times reviewer speculated that either Simon or Segal was inspired by the true 1966 case of Robert Friede, a 25-year-old Annenberg publishing heir, and Celeste Crenshaw, a drug-addicted 19-year-old socialite whose corpse was found in Friede's car. Friede was the son of Evelyn Annenberg Hall and her first husband, Kenneth Friede. Crenshaw and Friede's story is told in the book Turned On: The Friede-Crenshaw Case (1967) by Dick Schaap.

Based on Simon's 1968 novel, the film's working title was Heir. The rights of the novel were initially acquired by Anthony Spinner and Barry Shear in October 1968. In June 1969, it was announced that Herb Jaffe of United Artists was set to produce the film in collaboration with Joseph M. Schenck Enterprises.

Actress Kim Hunter filmed some scenes as Jennifer's mother, but they were cut following a "disastrous preview" in San Francisco, which prompted the film's makers to edit it several times. The film marked the feature debuts for Bostwick and Conaway.  It was shot on location in New York City, Venice and New Jersey.

Reception
The film received generally negative reviews. A reviewer of Variety noted: "The delightfully ridiculous plot, mock-sentimental narration, absurd dialog, infectious syrupy music and intermittent idyllic interludes all parody Love Story. And yet, like Pretty Poison, this is a potpourri of disarming satire, black comedy and poignancy that creates a strangely haunting aura. Michael Brandon, as Marcus, is charmingly boyish and natural. Tippy Walker, as Jennifer, comes across with a bitchy ethereal allure."

See also
 List of American films of 1971

References

External links 
 
 
 

1971 films
1970s black comedy films
1971 comedy-drama films
American black comedy films
Films about heroin addiction
Films based on American novels
Films directed by Noel Black
Films set in New Jersey
Films set in New York City
Films set in Venice
Films shot in New York City
Films shot in Venice
United Artists films
1971 comedy films
1971 drama films
1970s English-language films
1970s American films